Julien Hequembourg Bryan (23 May 1899 in Titusville, Pennsylvania – 20 October 1974) was an American photographer, filmmaker, and documentarian. He is best known for documenting the daily life in Poland, Soviet Union, and Nazi Germany between 1935 and 1939, in the leadup to and early days of the Second World War.
He was honored with Zasłużony dla Kultury Polskiej" ("Merit for Polish culture") during his last visit in Poland (1974) for showing the truth about the Invasion of Poland.

His documentary film Siege reported on Poland's defense of its capital against Nazi Germany in September 1939. It is stored and viewable online at the Steven Spielberg Film and Video Archive at the United States Holocaust Memorial Museum in a digitally restored form in HD.

Before World War II 

Bryan was a son of an elder in the Presbyterian Church with a long missionary tradition.

At seventeen after graduating from high school, he volunteered to serve in the American Field Service for the French Army in World War I, driving an ambulance in Verdun and the Argonne, and wrote a book Ambulance 464 about this experience illustrated by his photographs.

He graduated from Princeton University in 1921 and finished Union Theological Seminary, though he chose not to be ordained as a minister. Afterwards he directed YMCA in Brooklyn, NY
At this time Bryan started traveling abroad taking photographs, making films and writing travelogues along the way. He funded his travels by giving slideshow lectures about countries he visited and by selling his films to various companies including ERPI. Many of the films from those travels can be found in United States Holocaust Memorial Museum's Steven Spielberg Film and Video Archive. Those human-interest movies chronicle travels through China, Caucasus and Georgia (1933), Soviet Union (1930 and 1935), Poland (1936), Germany (1937), Switzerland and the Netherlands (1939). His films and photographs from Nazi Germany chronicled party rallies, daily life on the streets, anti-Jewish propaganda and Nazi leaders. They were incorporated into two ’’March of Time’’ films. His slide lectures were held in concert halls including Carnegie Hall.

World War II

Bryan learned about the German invasion of Poland on September 3 while traveling by train to Warsaw. He arrived in Warsaw on September 7 carrying his Leica still camera, Bell & Howell movie camera and 6000 feet of film, just as all foreigners, diplomats and government official were fleeing the capital. He contacted mayor of Warsaw Stefan Starzynski who provided him with a car, guide and interpreter Stefan Radlinski and permit to travel and photograph across Warsaw. In two weeks between September 7 and September 21, he managed to take hundreds of still photographs including color Kodachromes and 5000 feet of motion picture film documenting the Siege of Warsaw and the bombing of the city by German Luftwaffe. He recalled:

In 2009, the grown-up girl, Kazimiera Mika, spoke about the event and said she was 12 at the time. They first reunited in 1958, when Bryan returned to Warsaw.(She married and lived to the age of 93)

Bryan is credited as the only foreign journalist in Warsaw at that time. Through Polish Radio he also made an appeal to the American president Franklin Delano Roosevelt to help civilians targeted by enemy bombers. During his stay in Warsaw he lived in the abandoned Consulate of the United States.
He left Warsaw on September 21 after Germans declared a cease-fire to allow citizens of neutral countries to depart by train through East Prussia. In Königsberg fearing confiscation of his material he decided to smuggle out his already developed films. He managed to hide some of his films in souvenir gas mask containers collected by fellow traveler from US, and by one account he hid some movies by wrapping them around his torso.

After arriving in New York in the fall of 1939 Bryan published some of his photographs. Life magazine printed 15 of his images in the October 23 issue and Look Magazine published another 26 in the December 5 issue. Bryan produced in 1940 as a short documentary film Siege, released by RKO Radio Pictures. and wrote a book with the same title. The film was nominated for an Academy Award the following year for Best Short Subject, One-reel. Although film Siege is only 10 minutes long, Julien Bryan presented Franklin Delano Roosevelt his 80 minutes long film from fighting Warsaw.

In 1940 Bryan was hired by the Office of the Coordinator of Inter-American Affairs (OCIAA) to make a series of 23 educational movies on Latin American culture and customs. Afterwards State Department hired him to create another five movies about the US.

After World War II
Bryan returned to Poland in 1946. As part of an official UNRRA delegation he revisited Gdańsk and Warsaw. His Kodachrome footage of recently destroyed Gdańsk is probably the first post-war film shot in that city.

In 1958 Bryan revisited Poland and published one hundred of his 1939 photographs from Warsaw. Working with daily newspaper Express Wieczorny they launched a big campaign, with a page of the 1939 pictures in each issue, and the words: "Do you recognize yourself, your relatives, your house and street? The Express is helping American photographer Julien Bryan to find the heroes of his film from besieged Warsaw in 1939." Readers who recognized anything in his pictures were asked to come to the newspaper's offices with that information. That way he met and recorded stories of many people in his photographs. He wrote about his experiences in Warsaw: 1939 siege, 1959 Warsaw Revisited published in 1959 in Poland.

In 1945, Bryan started the International Film Foundation (IFF) and for the remainder of his career he made short documentary films for the school market. Son Sam Bryan joined IFF in 1960. Bryan died in 1974, just two months after receiving a medal from the Polish government for his still photography. After his death IFF was operated by Sam. In 2003 Sam Bryan donated both his father's still and motion picture footage of wartime Europe to the United States Holocaust Memorial Museum. Many of his works are currently held by the Library of Congress and the United States Holocaust Memorial Museum's Steven Spielberg Film and Video Archive In 2006 Siege was named to the National Film Registry of the USA by the Librarian of Congress as "a unique, horrifying record of the dreadful brutality of war". It was also nominated for an Academy Award.

His World War II experiences in Warsaw were fictionalized in the 1978 film ... The role of unnamed "American journalist" based on Julien Bryan was portrayed by Jack Recknitz.

Director Eugeniusz Starky assembled Bryan's 1939 footage, including previously unseen archival material, into the documentary film Korespondent Bryan, premiering in Warsaw in 2010.

References

External links

 Biography of Julien Bryan at The Nation
  (circa 1943), short documentary film about education in Latin America, at the Internet Archive
 Bryan's films held by the USHMM
 Films produced and/or distributed by the International Film Foundation or Julien Bryan
 The Julien Hequembourg Bryan papers are available for research at the Hoover Institution Library and Archives.
Article and photographs by Julien Bryan in Mar 1940 Popular Mechanics.

1899 births
1974 deaths
People from Titusville, Pennsylvania
American Presbyterians
American documentary filmmakers
American photojournalists
Princeton University alumni
Union Theological Seminary (New York City) alumni
Articles containing video clips
Journalists from Pennsylvania
20th-century American journalists
American male journalists